Albert Lewis Barthelme Sr. (October 10, 1919 – March 4, 2004) was an American basketball coach at the high school, college and professional levels.

Barthelme coached the Loyola College Greyhounds basketball team for the 1944–1945 season, playing for the team the following season. From 1946 to 1950 he was athletics director, basketball and football coach at Towson Catholic High School where one of his students was future NBA player and coach Gene Shue.

Barthelme was head basketball coach at the University of Baltimore from 1950 to 1954. Using an offense-dominated approach dubbed "firehouse" basketball, he was the subject of numerous newspaper stories about the high-scoring games. Seven games into the 1953–1954 season, the team was averaging well over 100 points per game.

An assistant coach and publicist for the Baltimore Bullets 1954–1955 season, Barthelme was named head coach on November 20, 1954 but would only coach three games before the club went out of business on November 27.

In 1961 Barthelme coached basketball for St. Mary's Seminary Junior College and Patuxent Naval Base.

Following his brief NBA stint, Barthelme worked in public relations at Carling Brewing Co., later becoming a beer distributor in 1962. From 1966 to 1985 he served as supervisor of the St. Mary's County, Maryland Youth Commission which later became the Department of Parks and Recreation. Barthelme was survived by his second wife, five sons, a daughter, and 11 grandchildren, and predeceased by his first wife and one son.

References

1919 births
2004 deaths
American men's basketball players
Baltimore Bees men's basketball coaches
Baltimore Bullets (1944–1954) head coaches
Basketball coaches from New York (state)
High school basketball coaches in Maryland
High school football coaches in Maryland
Loyola Greyhounds men's basketball coaches
Loyola Greyhounds men's basketball players
People from Blue Point, New York
Sportspeople from Suffolk County, New York